Konjari is an uninhabited village in the municipality of Debar, North Macedonia.

Demographics
The 1971 Yugoslav census was the last to record any people as residing in the village which contained 415 inhabitants, of which 414 were Albanians and 1 Macedonian. According to the 2002 census, the village had 0 inhabitants.

References

External links

Villages in Debar Municipality
Albanian communities in North Macedonia